Monument is an unincorporated community in northeast Logan County, Kansas, United States.  As of the 2020 census, the population of the community and nearby areas was 56.  It is located along U.S. Route 40 west of Oakley.

History
Established sometime in the latter half of the 19th century, it was originally called Monument Station as it served as a stop for the overland stage and for travelers moving westward through Fort Wallace.

Geography

Climate
According to the Köppen Climate Classification system, Monument has a semi-arid climate, abbreviated "BSk" on climate maps.

Demographics

For statistical purposes, the United States Census Bureau has defined this community as a census-designated place (CDP).

Transportation
U.S. Route 40 highway and Union Pacific Railroad pass through Monument.

References

Further reading

External links
 Logan County maps: Current, Historic, KDOT

Unincorporated communities in Logan County, Kansas
Unincorporated communities in Kansas